Eunephrops bairdii is a species of marine lobster, commonly called the "red lobster", endemic to the Caribbean Sea.

References

True lobsters
Crustaceans of the Atlantic Ocean
Arthropods of Colombia
Arthropods of Central America
Crustaceans described in 1885
Taxa named by Sidney Irving Smith